The following is a list of timekeeping terminology in the isiXhosa language.

Month names

Traditionally 

The traditional isiXhosa names for months of the year poetically come from names of stars, plants, and flowers that grow or seasonal changes that happen at a given time of year in Southern Africa.

The Xhosa year traditionally begins in June and ends in May when the brightest star visible in the Southern Hemisphere, Canopus, signals the time for harvesting. 

In urban areas today, anglicized versions of the months are used, especially by the younger generation, but in the rural areas of the Eastern Cape, the old names still stand.

Month by month they are, in relation with:

gregorian ones

Seasons 
 Autumn - eKwindla 
 Winter - uBusika 
 Spring - iNtlako hlaza/iNtwasahlobo 
 Summer - iHlobo

Days of the week 
 Sunday - iCawa
 Monday - uMvulo 
 Tuesday - uLwesibini
 Wednesday - uLwesithathu
 Thursday - uLwesine
 Friday - uLwesihlanu
 Saturday - uMgqibelo

See also 
Xhosa language
Xhosa people
Xhosa clan names
Zulu calendar

Further reading 

 Kirsch et al., Clicking with Xhosa, David Phillip Publishers, Cape Town, 2001, p. 43f.

Calendar
Calendar
Specific calendars